Roger de Streton DD (also Stratton) was an English medieval theologian and university chancellor.

Streton received a Doctor of Divinity degree. Between 1329 and 1330, he was Chancellor of Oxford University.

References

Year of birth unknown
Year of death unknown
English Roman Catholic theologians
Chancellors of the University of Oxford
13th-century English people
14th-century English people
13th-century Roman Catholics
14th-century Roman Catholics